Louis René Quentin de Richebourg de Champcenetz; (1759, in Paris – 23 July 1794, Paris) was a French journalist guillotined for his writings.  He was the son of the Marquis de Champcenetz, governor of the Tuileries Palace at the time of the French Revolution.

Sources
 Jean Chrétien Ferdinand Hoefer, Nouvelle Biographie générale, t. 9, Paris, Firmin-Didot, 1854, p. 187–188
 Gustave Vapereau, Dictionnaire universel des littératures, Paris, Hachette, 1876, p. 1190

1759 births
1794 deaths
French people executed by guillotine during the French Revolution
French male journalists
18th-century French journalists
18th-century French male writers
Writers from Paris